"Adagio for Strings" is a track by Dutch DJ Tiësto. It was first released in January 2005 as the fourth single from the album Just Be. The track takes its melody from the original composition by Samuel Barber, a piece in 3 time and adapts it into 4 time. In 2013, it was voted by Mixmag readers as the second greatest dance record of all time.

Formats and track listings

CD, maxi-singles
Australia, New Zealand, Sweden, United States Maxi-single
 "Adagio for Strings" (Radio Edit)–3:28
 "Adagio for Strings" (Original LP Version)–9:33
 "Adagio for Strings" (Danjo & Styles Remix) - 11:22
 "Adagio for Strings" (Fred Baker Remix) - 8:18
 "Adagio for Strings" (Phynn Remix) - 7:09

Germany, United Kingdom Maxi-single
 "Adagio for Strings" (Radio Edit)–3:25
 "Adagio for Strings" (Original Mix)–9:35
 "Adagio for Strings" (Fred Baker Remix) - 7:11
 "Adagio for Strings" (Danjo & Styles Remix) - 11:31
 "Adagio for Strings" (Phynn Remix) - 8:26
 "Adagio for Strings" (video) - 3:31
 Includes a photo gallery and an interview taken from the DVD Tiësto In Concert 2.

12" vinyl
Independence Records, Universal Licensing Music (ULM) 12" Vinyl
 "Adagio for Strings" (Original Album Version)–7:23
 "Adagio for Strings" (Radio Edit)–3:47

Nebula, Magik Muzik, Media Records 12" Vinyl
 "Adagio for Strings" (Original LP Version)–9:33
 "Adagio for Strings" (Fred Baker Remix)–7:11

Nebula, Magik Muzik, Nettwerk America 12" Vinyl
 "Adagio for Strings" (Danjo & Styles Remix)–11:24
 "Adagio for Strings" (Phynn Remix)–8:18

Charts

Weekly charts

Year-end charts

Certifications

Official versions
 Just Be Album Version (7:23)
 Parade of the Athletes Album Version (5:57)
 Parade of the Athletes: Unmixed Album Version (9:34)
 Danjo & Styles Remix (11:31)
 Fred Baker Remix (7:11)
 Music Video (3:31)
 Original Mix (9:35)
 Phynn Remix (8:26)
 Radio Edit (3:25)
 Wrongun! Remix (7:55)
 W&W 2012 Rework (6:17)
 Blasterjaxx Remix (6:53)

Release history

References

External links
 About Adagio for Strings
 Discogs
 

2004 songs
2005 singles
Tiësto songs